Ștefan Pop (born 16 February 1987) is a Romanian operatic tenor. He is considered among today's leading lyric tenors and he is best known for bel canto repertoire. He has won several prizes including, in 2010, Plácido Domingo's Operalia competition and the Seoul International Music Competition.

Early life and education

Pop was born in Bistrița. He started studying violin when he was seven, and he sang in his elementary school choir. He trained at the Gheorghe Dima Music Academy in Cluj-Napoca, graduating in 2010.

Career

He began his professional career in 2009 at Hungarian Opera Cluj as Paolino in Il matrimonio segreto and as Nemorino in L'elisir d'amore at the Romanian National Opera, Timișoara. Pop made his international operatic debut in Teatro dell'opera di Roma in December 2009 as Alfredo in La traviata, under the baton of Gianluigi Gelmetti, in a production of Franco Zeffirelli.

In 2010, at the age of 23, he won First Male and the Public Prize at Plácido Domingo's Operalia, The World Opera Competition at the Teatro alla Scala, and also won first prize at International Music Competition in Seoul.

After winning Operalia, Pop made his debut at Vienna State Opera as Alfredo in La traviata, and also sang it at Greek National Opera, Romanian National Opera, Timișoara, Hamburg State Opera alongside Edita Gruberová, under the baton of Simone Young; also at Teatro Verdi di Trieste (2010) as Nemorino in L'elisir d'amore and at Hamburg State Opera (2011) and sung his first Elvino in La sonnambula at Vienna State Opera under Evelino Pido's baton in the same year. Later that year he also made his debut at Zurich Opera as Cassio in Verdi's Otello under Daniele Gatti's baton and in Seoul as Il Duca di Mantova in Rigoletto. In 2011, he did La traviata in Teatro Carlo Felice, Teatro Massimo alongside Mariella Devia, Israeli Opera and Oper Frankfurt.

In February 2012 Pop made his first appearance on the stage of Opéra Bastille as Il Duca di Mantova in Rigoletto. In December 2012 he made his debut at the Royal Opera House in London, performing Nemorino in L'elisir d'amore, and also in Lausanne Opera. In the same year he was invited by Plácido Domingo to perform at his Operalia winners Gala at the Royal Opera House in London.

In 2011 and 2012, Pop was guest in four of Angela Gheorghiu's concerts in the Far East (Seoul and Shanghai) and Middle East (Oman) very well received by the audience. Pop made his debut in Stabat Mater by Gioachino Rossini and Te Deum of Georges Bizet at XVII Festival de Musique Sacree de Marseille. At Soirées Lyriques de Sanxay he made in 2012 La traviata and in 2016 Rigoletto.

2013 brought the debut at the Bolshoi Theatre in Moscow as Alfredo in La traviata and also the debut in the title role of Faust at the National Opera in Bucharest. At Hamburg staatsoper he made a new production of La Traviata. It was a very successful performance soon followed by other Faust performances at Opera Rijeka (Croatia, March 2014) and Hong Kong Cultural Center (May 2014). Also in 2013, Pop was invited by Plácido Domingo to perform together in the Verdi–Wagner Gala at the Arena di Verona under Daniel Oren's baton.

In June 2014 he made his debut as Rodolfo in the concert version of La bohème at Salle Pleyel in Paris, alongside Patrizia Ciofi. Later on, in August 2014, he also made a debut, as the Italian singer in Der Rosenkavalier at the Salzburg Festival, a performance that is now available on DVD. Also in 2014 he sung in La traviata at Opera Menorca together with Leo Nucci and Norah Amselem, L'elisir d'amore at Monte Carlo Opera and a new production of La Sonnambula at Frankfurt Oper under the baton of Eun Sun Kim.

In February 2015, Pop made the debut in Don Giovanni at Opéra Bastille, Paris, alongside a great cast under Alain Altinoglu's baton. He took part in two major music festivals, the Menuhin Festival Gstaad, Switzerland, as Don Ottavio in Don Giovanni, together with Erwin Schrott; and the George Enescu Festival in Bucharest, Romania, in an open air concert conducted by David Crescenzi. In November 2015, he did La traviata at Teatro di San Carlo, under the baton of Nello Santi. In the same year he made L'elisir d'amore at Israeli Opera.

In November 2015 he was offered the title of honorary citizen of his home town, Bistrita.

In 2016 he sang three major roles, Pollione in Norma, with Mariella Devia and Nello Santi at Teatro di San Carlo; Roberto Devereux in Roberto Devereux with Mariella Devia and Sonia Ganassi at Teatro Carlo Felice; Foresto in Attila (opera) under the baton of Riccardo Frizza at La Fenice. He made his debut at Teatro Real with Mariella Devia in Norma, conductor Roberto Abbado and director Davide Livermore. In 2016 he also sang in Rigoletto, at Opera Sanxay; La traviata at La Fenice and at Taormina Teatro Antico. In October 2016 he sang in Faust at Opera de Oviedo.

In February 2017 he made his debut at Teatro Regio (Parma) in La bohème, where he returned in January 2018 for Rigoletto with Leo Nucci and in March 2018 in Roberto Devereux with Mariella Devia. He also made in 2017  his Edgardo debut at Teatro Comunale di Bologna in Lucia di Lammermoor under the baton of Michele Mariotti. The role of Pollione brought him alongside Mariella Devia in Japan to Biwako Hall Center for Performing Arts, Shiga, for Norma. In the same year he made Rigoletto at Teatro di San Carlo with Nello Santi and La Traviata in Seoul.

In 2018 in Italy they called him Mariella's tenor because he had the responsibility to sing the last productions she made on stage: Norma at Teatro Carlo Felice (DVD), Roberto Devereux at Teatro Regio (Parma), Norma at La Fenice ("Adio alle scene di Mariella Devia"). He made his debut as Gabriele Adorno in Simon Boccanegra (Teatro Comunale di Bologna), in Rigoletto ( Teatro Massimo, Teatro Coccia Novara), in La traviata (La Fenice), in La bohème under the baton of Daniel Oren (Teatro Massimo), in La bohème (Opera Nationala Timișoara, Opera Nationala Bucuresti, Singapore, Taiwan), in L'elisir d'amore (Opera Nationala Romana Cluj-Napoca). Pop also made two concerts in 2018, one in Tallinn, Estonia, and the another one in Lvov, Ukraine. The most important production of 2018 was the realization of Il castello di Kenilworth DVD at Donizetti Opera Festival.

2019 was an important year in his career, he opened the Festival Verdi 2019 at Teatro Regio Parma with I due foscari (DVD) and also he made his debut at Festival Puccini 2019 in La Bohème alongside Angela Gheorghiu, and Madama Butterfly. For the first time at Teatro Regio di Torino, Pop did a new production of Rigoletto by director John Turturro under the baton of Renato Palumbo, alongside Carlos Alvarez. Pop did the role of Duke in Rigoletto in Teatro Comunale di Bologna and Opera Nationala Romana Cluj Napoca. He returned to Teatro Carlo Felice for two Puccini operas, Madama Butterfly and La Bohème. At Opera Nationala Bucuresti he sang La Bohème and La Traviata. In October–November, Pop made: Stefan Pop & Friends Opera Gala Concert Japan Tour in Tokyo, Osaka, Yokohama, Musashino. In December La Bohème brings him back at Wiener Staatsoper.

In September 2019 he received Special prize Oscar della Lirica: Golden Opera for Young Generation at Teatro La Fenice.

2020 started for Pop with two debuts, Lucrezia Borgia  at Teatro Lirico Giuseppe Verdi followed by Nabucco at Teatro Regio (Turin)  alongside Leo Nucci and conducted by Donato Renzetti. Pop sing alongside Angela Gheorghiu at Opéra Royal de Wallonie in last production of La bohème directed by Stefano Mazzonis di Pralafera a coproduction made by Mezzo TV.

In 2021 he made his first opera-movie La traviata by Giuseppe Verdi for Classica HD at Teatro Massimo Bellini conducted by Maria Fabrizio Carminati and directed by Paolo Gavazzeni and Piero Maranghi. In May 2021 he sing Faust (opera) alongside George Petean at Opera Nationala Romana Cluj, in July he made his debut at Teatro Comunale Modena  in opera Rigoletto, in September he sing Requiem (Verdi) at Slovak Philharmonic, in November sing Lucrezia Borgia (opera) at Müpa Budapest. Pop sing Duca di Mantova in opera Rigoletto alongside Leo Nucci in role of Rigoletto and as stage director and conducted by Plácido Domingo in Bellini Fest at Taormina Arte, where he also sing the concert " Mira, O Norma" with Marina Rebeka followed by Norma (opera) conducted by Maria Fabrizio Carminati a coproduction of Rai5.  Pop sing alongside Saioa Hernández in Madama Butterfly at Berlin State Opera and in December alongside Angela Gheorghiu sing La bohème at Teatro Massimo conducted by Maria Fabrizio Carminati. He returned at Opera Nationala Timisoara and Opera Nationala Romana Bucuresti with La bohème. In November he made a Japan tour "L'elisir d'amore".

Personal life
Pop got married in May 2019.

Discography
DVDs
 2014: Strauss – Der Rosenkavalier (Krassimira Stoyanova, Sophie Koch, Mojca Erdmann, Wiebke Lehmkuhl, Günther Groissböck, Adrian Eröd, Krešimir Špicer, Ștefan Pop)
 2017: Donizetti – Roberto Devereux (Mariella Devia, Sonia Ganassi, Stefan Pop, Mansoo Kim, Alessandro Fantoni, Claudio Ottino, Matteo Armanino, Loris Purpura)
 2018: Donizetti – Il castello di Kenilworth (Jessica Pratt, Carmela Remigio, Xabier Anduaga, Stefan Pop, Federica Vitale, Dario Russo)
2019: Bellini – Norma (Mariella Devia, Annalisa Stropa, Stefan Pop, Riccardo Fassi, Andrea Battistoni)

Repertory
Pop's repertoire includes the following:

 Bellini: Norma – Pollione
 Bellini: La sonnambula – Elvino
 Bizet: Te Deum
 Cimarosa: Il matrimonio segreto – Paolino
 Donizetti: L'elisir d'amore – Nemorino
 Donizetti: Lucia di Lammermoor – Sir Edgardo di Ravenswood
 Donizetti: Lucrezia Borgia – Gennaro
 Donizetti: Elisabetta al castello di Kenilworth – Warney
 Donizetti: Roberto Devereux – Roberto Devereux
 Gounod: Faust – Faust
 Mozart: Don Giovanni – Don Ottavio
 Puccini: La bohème – Rodolfo
 Puccini: Madama Butterfly – F. B. Pinkerton
 Puccini: Tosca - Mario Cavaradossi
 Rossini: Stabat Mater
 Strauss: Der Rosenkavalier – An Italian singer
 Verdi: Attila – Foresto
 Verdi: Un ballo in maschera – Riccardo
 Verdi: Don Carlo - Don Carlo
 Verdi: I due Foscari – Jacobo Foscari
 Verdi: La traviata – Alfredo
 Verdi: Nabucco – Ismaele
 Verdi: Rigoletto – Duca di Mantova
 Verdi: Requiem
 Verdi: Simon Boccanegra – Gabriele Adorno
 Verdi: Otello – Cassio

Awards
 2010: First Male and Public prize at Operalia, The World Opera Competition
 2015: Honorary Citizen of Bistrita
 2018: Dimitrie Popoviciu-Bayreuth Awards at Cluj Opera Ball
 2019: Young Generation at Oscar della lirica-International Opera Awards

References

External links 
 
 

1987 births
People from Bistrița
Romanian operatic tenors
21st-century Romanian male opera singers
Living people
Operalia, The World Opera Competition prize-winners